Shamsun Nahar is a politician of the Bangladesh Awami League. She was elected at the 11th Jatiya Sangsad of Bangladesh at the reserved seat category for women at seat-13.

Biography 
Shamsun Nahar was born at Gazipur District.

Nahar is an Awami League politician of Bangladesh. She was elected without competition among 49 others as 11th Jatiya Sangsad Member from the women's reserve seat-13. The speaker of the house Shirin Sharmin Chaudhury took her oath as a member on 20 February 2019.

See also 
 List of Parliament members of 11th Jatiya Sangsad

References

External links 
 List of members of 10th Jatiya Sangsad (2014) –Jatiya Sangsad

Living people
Awami League politicians
People from Gazipur District
11th Jatiya Sangsad members
Women members of the Jatiya Sangsad
21st-century Bangladeshi women politicians
1957 births